Johann Weber (26 April 1927 – 23 May 2020) was an Austrian Catholic bishop.

Weber was born in Austria and was ordained to the priesthood in 1950. He served as bishop of the Diocese of Graz-Seckau, Austria, from 1969 until 2001. Weber was also Chairman of the Episcopal Conference of Austria between 1995 and 1998.

Notes

1927 births
2020 deaths
20th-century Roman Catholic bishops in Austria
Bishops of Graz-Seckau